Several railroad companies have been called the New York and Boston Railroad:
New York and Boston Railroad (1869–1872) of New York, predecessor of the New York Central Railroad
New York and Boston Railroad (1846–1865) of Connecticut, predecessor of the New York, New Haven and Hartford Railroad
New York and Boston Inland Railroad, formed in 1882 and never built
New York and Boston Rapid Transit Company, a never-built plan in the mid-1880s